The Gold Coast is a 1990 novel by American author, Nelson DeMille. It introduces DeMille’s recurring character, John Sutter. The Gate House is the sequel to The Gold Coast.

Plot
Welcome to the Gold Coast, that stretch on the North Shore of Long Island that once held the greatest concentration of wealth and power in America. Here two men are destined for an explosive collision: John Sutter, Wall Street lawyer, holding fast to a fading aristocratic legacy; and Frank Bellarosa, the Mafia don who seizes his piece of the staid and unprepared Gold Coast like a latter-day barbarian chief and draws Sutter and his regally beautiful wife, Susan, into his violent world. Told from Sutter's sardonic - and often hilarious - point of view, and laced with sexual passion and suspense, The Gold Coast is Nelson DeMille's captivating story of friendship and seduction, love and betrayal.

External links

Novels by Nelson DeMille
1990 American novels
Novels set in New York City
Novels set in Long Island